The 1995 World Doubles Cup was a tennis tournament played on outdoor clay courts at the Craiglockhart Tennis Centre in Edinburgh in Scotland that was part of the 1995 WTA Tour. The tournament was held from May 24 through May 27, 1995.

Winners

Women's doubles

 Meredith McGrath /  Larisa Savchenko defeated  Manon Bollegraf /  Rennae Stubbs 6–2, 7–6
 It was McGrath's 3rd title of the year and the 21st of her career. It was Savchenko's 3rd title of the year and the 54th of her career.

World Doubles Cup
WTA Doubles Championships
May 1995 sports events in the United Kingdom